Barbados v. Trinidad and Tobago was a 2006 arbitral case between Barbados and Trinidad and Tobago in which the tribunal resolved the maritime border dispute between the two countries. The dispute was arbitrated before an arbitral tribunal constituted under Annex VII of the United Nations Convention on the Law of the Sea, in which the Permanent Court of Arbitration served as registry.

Background
In 1990, Venezuela and Trinidad and Tobago signed a maritime boundary treaty. The treaty purported to assign to Trinidad and Tobago ocean territory that Barbados claimed as its own. The countries were unable to resolve their dispute for 14 years. In 2004, Barbados elected to force the issue into binding arbitration under the United Nations Convention on the Law of the Sea. The arbitral tribunal heard the case.

Tribunal award
The tribunal's award was issued on 11 April 2006. The boundary was set nearly midway between the land of the two island countries. Although neither country's claimed boundary was adopted by the court, the boundary that was set was closer to that claimed by Trinidad and Tobago. Both countries claimed victory after the arbitration award was announced.

See also
Barbados – Trinidad and Tobago relations

Notes

References
Andon Blake and Gary A. Campbell, "Conflict over flying fish: The dispute between Trinidad & Tobago and Barbados", Marine Policy, vol. 31, no. 3, May 2007, pp. 327–335.
 Barbados/Trinidad and Tobago Award, Tribunal's President H.E. Stephen M. Schwebel, published in XXVII UNRIAA 147-251 and PCA Award Series and Cambridge 2010 and Key Boundaries
 Analysis of Barbados/Trinidad and Tobago under Presidency of H.E. Judge Stephen M. Schwebel and Award's Map and Coalter Lathrop Map and 22 IJMCL 7-60 2007 and NILOS and NILOS Online Papers and NILOS New Website and 39 GWILR pp.573-620 2007 No.3 and Full Text and Catalogue
 Barbados Submission to CLCS and 22nd CLCS 18 August-12 September 2008
INTERNATIONAL BOUNDARY CONSULTANTS
How Trinidad Recognised Venezuela's Claim to Most Of Guyana's Land 18 June 2007, Notes From The Margin

External links
Permanent Court of Arbitration case page

2006 in case law
2006 in Barbados
2006 in Trinidad and Tobago
Permanent Court of Arbitration cases
Barbados–Trinidad and Tobago border
Disputed waters
Disputed territories in North America